Joe Powers is an internationally acclaimed harmonica player, composer, and recording artist. He performs many music genres, such as classical, blues, jazz-fusion, and world traditions, and specializes in playing Argentine Tango music.<ref name="OPB">[http://www.opb.org/artsandlife/article/video-joe-powers-harmonica-tango/ “Video: Joe Powers on Harmonica & Tango.] January 24, 2012. Oregon Public Broadcasting.</ref> Powers started playing the harmonica at two years of age, and majored in music composition at the University of Oregon. He has traveled to many countries to perform his music, and has been characterized as a "virtuoso".
In 2005 he won a prize for his work at the quadrennial World Harmonica Championship in Germany, and at a Belgian competition in 2008 he won the classical division. Powers resides in Portland, Oregon.

Discography
The following are albums from Joe Powers.
 Amor de Tango (2007)
 Mélancolie (2009)
 Just Duet! (2012)
 Apasionado'' (2015)

See also
 List of harmonicists

References

External links

 Official website

Living people
American harmonica players
Musicians from Portland, Oregon
University of Oregon alumni
Year of birth missing (living people)
Place of birth missing (living people)